Cristian  Raudales Martinez (born October 3, 1989) is a Honduran footballer who currently plays for amateur team FC Kendall.

Career 
After four years playing college soccer at Florida Gulf Coast University from 2008 to 2011.  Raudales was an All-Conference selection during his college career for the years 2009, 2010, 2011.  He graduated the FGCU program as the highest leading scorer, the record holder for overall points (goals and assists combined), and helped the team reach the 1st round of the NCAA tournament during his senior year.  Raudales signed with German fourth division club BSV Schwarz-Weiß Rehden. After leaving the club at the end of the 2014 season, Raudales trialled with and eventually signed for NASL club. FC Edmonton.  Raudales had a very successful amateur/high school career.  He is a former NSCAA Adidas High School All-American for the years 2007, 2008.  Florida High School player of the year for 2007, 2008.  And also NSCAA All-South Region 1st team 2005-2008.

References

External links 
 FC Edmonton bio

1989 births
Living people
Florida Gulf Coast Eagles men's soccer players
Honduran footballers
Honduran expatriate footballers
FC Edmonton players
Expatriate soccer players in Canada
North American Soccer League players
Sportspeople from Tegucigalpa
Association football midfielders
Expatriate soccer players in the United States
Honduran expatriate sportspeople in the United States